§



Medal summary

Women's events

See also 
 Artistic gymnastics at the 2010 Central American and Caribbean Games
 Trampoline at the 2010 Central American and Caribbean Games

References

External links 
  

Events at the 2010 Central American and Caribbean Games
July 2010 sports events in North America
Central American and Caribbean Games Rhythmic gymnastics
2010 Rhythmic